Graeme John Hugo  (5 December 1946 – 20 January 2015) was an Australian demographer, academic, and geographer. Hugo, a professor of geography at University of Adelaide, was considered one of Australia's leading demographers. He served as the director of the Australian Migration and Population Research Centre at the University of Adelaide. Some of his most recent studies focused on discrimination against job-seekers from non-English speaking families and backgrounds. He was elected a fellow of the Academy of the Social Sciences in Australia in 1987. In 2012, Hugo was honoured as an Officer of the Order of Australia for his work in population research.

Graeme Hugo died from a short illness on 20 January 2015, at the age of 68.

References

External links
Australian Migration and Population Research Centre

1946 births
2015 deaths
Australian demographers
Officers of the Order of Australia
Academic staff of the University of Adelaide
Australian National University alumni
Flinders University alumni
University of Adelaide alumni
Deaths from cancer in South Australia
Australian geographers
Fellows of the Academy of the Social Sciences in Australia